The Embassy of Japan in Lima is the official diplomatic mission of Japan to the Republic of Peru.

The current Japanese ambassador to Peru is Kazuyuki Katayama.

History
Peru and Japan first established relations in 1873, with Peru being the first Latin American country to establish diplomatic relations with the East Asian state. The Imperial Legation that had been established in Lima was closed in 1942 due to the rupture of relations between both countries as a result of World War II.

After the end of the war, the Japanese Legation in Peru was reopened on June 8, 1952, becoming the Japanese Consulate in Lima on December 26 of the same year, and finally becoming the Japanese Embassy in Lima.

On November 19, 2017, the embassy moved from its location of San Felipe 356 to the SkyTower757 building.

Incidents

Furuya Incident
As a result of the large-scale Japanese immigration to Peru, the Peruvian government had to implement a limit to the number of immigrants. However, this was not implemented. As a result, a monopoly among the 22,560 Japanese nationals, accounting for 46.7% of all foreigners in the country, began to develop in contrast to Peruvian businesses, leading to tension between Peruvians and the Japanese, as the former started to develop a dislike for the latter which peaked in the years preceding World War II. Japanese support for the Manchurian Incident and their athelets at the 1936 Summer Olympics did not assist in their situation.

The Japanese legation at the time had great authority over its subjects at the time, having the capacity to forcibly remove them if necessary. Nevertheless, it attempted to negotiate with the Peruvian government when it started cracking down on Japanese businesses due to their unsanitary conditions. Tokijiro Furuya, a Japanese national, managed to negotiate with Peruvian authorities and resist attempts by the Japanese Central Society so that his business could remain open. The latter had been part of an attempt to try and improve the public image of the Nikkei among nationals, also cracking down on unruly businesses and attempting to avoid a monopoly or the idea among locals of the existence of one.

After the Japanese Consul Shun Sato, who opposed the situation of Furuya's businesses, personally wrote a deportation request to Peruvian authorities, he received an answer by the Ministry of the Interior allowing Furuya's deportation. As a result, a crowd arrived at Furuya's house and forcibly removed him, taking him to Callao to be deported to Japan aboard the Ginyo Maru. The event left an unfavorable view of the Japanese by both the Peruvian government and press. The former expected the Consul to resign due to his poor handling of the situation, which did not happen.

1940 Lima riots
In 1940, a series of race riots against the businesses of Japanese nationals took place, as their businesses were looted and the Japanese themselves attacked. The district of Jesus Maria was notably targeted due to its larger Japanese population, with the entire event causing an estimated loss of S/.7 million. The 1940 Lima earthquake took place during the events, worsening the situation.

Internal conflict in Peru
During the internal conflict in Peru, like other embassies, the embassy was targeted, as it was affected by a series of embassy bombings that took place on February 21, 1986 and also targeted the Chinese, German, Romanian, Spanish, Chilean and Argentine embassies.

Japanese embassy hostage crisis

In December 1996, terrorists from the Túpac Amaru Revolutionary Movement stormed the residence of the Japanese ambassador, Morihisa Aoki, and held the attendees of a party celebrating the birthday of emperor Akihito hostage for several months in what became known as the Japanese embassy hostage crisis. The situation would end with the execution of Operation Chavín de Huántar, a successful raid by the Peruvian Armed Forces on April 22, 1997.

The location of the former embassy implicated in the hostage crisis was eventually demolished, with only the outside walls remaining.

See also
Japan–Peru relations
List of ambassadors of Peru to Japan

References

Japan
Diplomatic missions of Japan
Japan–Peru relations